The Shauna Taylor Case was a 2018 criminal trial involving the investigation and conviction of Shauna Dee Taylor, a Floridian housewife who had poisoned her prematurely-born infant daughter (unnamed in public sources) with Tylenol iron supplements, causing acute liver damage due to iron poisoning, from which the child unexpectedly survived. The case rose to further prominence in 2019 when two of Shauna's then-grown adult children, Annie and Joshua Taylor, appeared publicly on the daytime talk show Dr. Phil, reporting that all 10 children documented as being under Shauna's care at one point or another, including themselves, had been subjected to severe physical, verbal and medical abuse. Shauna was diagnosed with Munchausen by proxy and convicted to 12 years in prison for aggravated child abuse, with 15 months of parole to follow.

Background
Shauna and her husband Bill Taylor lived in various US states in the time in which they had their children, having amassed a family of 10 children, later having several of these children removed from their care due to allegations of abuse in California and Arizona. Bill claimed to have no knowledge of Shauna's abuse of the children, arguing that he was absent from the family most of the time for work-related reasons. He divorced Shauna after the poisoning of their infant daughter. "The time that these poisonings occurred, I had been out of the home already for six months and I was working six days a week, 10 hours a day," Bill said in 2019. "On the several visits to the emergency room, I was scratching my head thinking, my gosh. How could all my kids have such severe medical issues?"

It is unclear to what extent Shauna abused the children under her care. Annie Taylor alleged on Dr. Phil that she had been given unprescribed insulin in glasses of milk by Shauna when she was a child, with no medical advice from a doctor or nurse. Annie had also had two spinal taps, seemingly for no apparent recorded medical reason. Josh Taylor reported children, including himself, being put in dog cages as a form of humiliation while Shauna shouted profanities at them, being force-fed milk and money (metal coins that he would be made to swallow whole), and forcibly drugged with various over the counter and prescription medications. Shauna reportedly had an obsessive fixation on injuring the livers of her children and would damage their internal organs with repeated drugging and beatings. Annie and Josh reported that they continued to suffer the effects of this abuse into adulthood. These allegations made on Dr. Phil were later verified by ABC News, which revealed that Shauna's parental rights to the children had long-since been terminated.

Attempted murder case
Shauna Taylor was 40 years old and a resident of Macclenny, Florida when she had an infant daughter born premature in late 2012, whom she began bringing to emergency rooms in 2013 for unspecified illnesses. The child was presenting with severe liver damage. According to investigators, in each of Shauna's initial visits to the hospital, Shauna included "exaggerated" and falsified symptoms of the child's health, having not yet been able to poison the child's liver until she had enough iron pills ready for doing so. In the third visit, the child was said to have experienced liver failure. "While the child was admitted to the hospital, [Shauna] would be there with the child and while she was there, she would administer the Tylenol to continue the abuse," according to Baker County Sheriff's Office Sergeant Tracie Benton, the lead detective on the case. Ultrasounds of the girl's liver showed abnormalities, and blood tests turned up high levels of iron. Around that time, investigators began receiving anonymous tips claiming that Taylor had Munchausen by proxy and was abusing the child. Those tipsters also informed investigators about a fundraising campaign online for the child, started by Shauna for the purposes of collecting money. Medical experts were able to test the child for certain poisons related to liver failure and determined there was iron in the child's system well above regular levels.  Eventually, after being removed from Shauna's care and given proper healthcare, the child's liver function returned to normal while she was in the hospital. Because the child survived, her name was never revealed by public news sources, and Shauna moved on to another state for habitation, leaving the case largely buried.

In 2018, the Shauna Taylor Case was re-investigated; the abuse of Annie, Josh and Shauna's other eight children then came out as news sources began uncovering old records of situations where Child Protective Services had removed various children from Shauna's care. Shauna was arrested in Albany, New York, extradited to Florida and tried for the intentional 2013 poisoning of her infant daughter, by the point at which roughly five years had passed since the incident had occurred. Shauna had initially pleaded not guilty. It was revealed that Shauna had a diagnosis of Munchausen by proxy, a psychological condition in which an individual imposes an appearance of a fake illness, or an actual illness, on a proxy, in most cases a minor child, for sympathy, money or attention. In Shauna's case, she had attempted to destroy her child's liver for the purposes of imposing an illness; this was not unheard of in the United States at that time, as cases such as the murder of Garnett Spears and the Gypsy Rose Blanchard case had been in the media in recent years. Shauna was convicted of aggravated child abuse and neglect and sentenced to 12 years in prison with 15 months of parole. Bill Taylor, who had maintained his innocence, was never charged or convicted of any crime or cited as Shauna's accomplice. By the time Shauna was sent to prison, Bill had separated from her and had lost contact with most of his 10 children.

See also
 Murder of Garnett Spears
 Murder of Olivia Gant
 Staudte Family Murders
 List of Munchausen by proxy cases

References 

2018 crimes in Florida
Factitious disorders
Child abuse incidents and cases
Child abuse in the United States
Poisoners